Maren may refer to:

 Maren (name), includes a list of people who have the given name and surname
 Maren, Netherlands
 Maren (energy management system)
 The Groovy Girls doll line, by Manhattan Toy, features a doll named Maren